Shawn Patrick Christian (born December 18, 1965) is an American television and film actor.

Life and career 

After graduating from Ferris State University in Big Rapids, Michigan in 1989 with a degree in marketing, he moved to Chicago to pursue an acting career. He starred in numerous stage productions and began appearing in commercials. He worked on stage with improvisational company Improv Olympic.

In 1994, he was the first male spokesman on Star Search. He landed his first television role as Mike Kasnoff also in 1994 on As the World Turns. In 1995, he was nominated for "Hottest Male Star" by Soap Opera Digest magazine. He starred on the show until 1997 before moving to Los Angeles. In 1999, he had a recurring role in The WB television series Charmed as Josh, the love interest of Piper Halliwell, played by Holly Marie Combs. He also landed the role of Johnny Durant on WB's short lived series Summerland. In 2002, he portrayed the role of Ross Rayburn in the soap opera One Life to Live. He was cast as a potential cowboy boyfriend of Jack in an episode of the final season of Will & Grace. In his most notable television role, Christian played doctor Daniel Jonas on Days of Our Lives from 2008 to 2017.

Personal life
Christian married Deborah Quinn on May 18, 1996. The couple met in 1991 while they were both auditioning for a print ad in Chicago. They have a son Kameron (born in 2000), who produces music. Christian's stepdaughter is actress Taylor Cole.  The two acted together in the television series Summerland and the Hallmark Channel made-for-tv film Ruby Herring Mysteries: Silent Witness. Christian and Quinn divorced in 2013.

On August 5, 2020 Shawn confirmed on The Locher Room show that he and former Days of Our Lives co-star Arianne Zucker have been dating for several years.
Since 28 June 2021, they have been engaged

Filmography

Film

Television

References

External links 

 

1965 births
Living people
American male television actors
Male actors from Grand Rapids, Michigan
Ferris State University alumni
Male models from Michigan
American male soap opera actors